Younes Ali Rahmati (born 3 January 1983) is a Qatari footballer. He plays as a midfielder and he's a member of the Qatar national football team.

Ali is nicknamed "Guardiola" because he used to play alongside Pep Guardiola, whom he considered his role model, in Al Ahli.

Club career statistics
Statistics accurate as of 21 May 2019

1Includes Emir of Qatar Cup.

2Includes Sheikh Jassem Cup.

3Includes AFC Champions League.

References

External links 
Player profile - doha-2006.com

Player profile - QSL.com.qa

1983 births
Living people
Qatari footballers
Qatar international footballers
Al-Rayyan SC players
2007 AFC Asian Cup players
Naturalised citizens of Qatar
Qatari people of Iranian descent
Al Ahli SC (Doha) players
Umm Salal SC players
Qatar Stars League players
Qatari football managers
Al Ahli SC (Doha) managers
Asian Games medalists in football
Footballers at the 2006 Asian Games
Asian Games gold medalists for Qatar
Association football midfielders
Medalists at the 2006 Asian Games